Greenly Island Conservation Park is a protected area associated with Greenly Island  located off the west coast of Eyre Peninsula in South Australia about  west of Coffin Bay.  It was declared in 1972 under the National Parks and Wildlife Act 1972  ‘to protect the island’s delicate ecology and Australian Sea-lion and New Zealand Fur-seal haul-out areas’  and continuing protected area status for the island which was first declared in 1919.  The conservation park is classified as an IUCN Category Ia protected area.

References

External links
Greenly Island Conservation Park webpage on protected planet

Conservation parks of South Australia
Protected areas established in 1967
1967 establishments in Australia